The Ōhinemahuta River, formerly known as the Onamalutu River, is a river of the Marlborough Region of New Zealand's South Island.

In August 2014, the name of the river was officially altered to Ōhinemahuta River. The former name of the river, Onamalutu, was a corruption of Ōhinemahuta, which refers to the place where the Rangitāne/Ngāti Mamoe ancestor Hine Mahuta once lived.

See also
List of rivers of New Zealand

References

Rivers of the Marlborough Region
Rivers of New Zealand